Slim, is an Arabic name which can be either a given name or a surname. It is also an English-language surname.

Notable people with the given name or surname include:

 Slim Albaher (born 1994), American YouTuber
 Slim Amamou (born 1977), Tunisian government minister
 Slim Belkhodja (born 1962), Tunisian chess Grandmaster
 Slim Dziri (1875–1953), Tunisian government minister
 Slim Mahfoudh (c. 1942–2017), Tunisian actor
 Maricopa Slim (1883–1914), American gunslinger
 Mongi Slim (1908–1969), Tunisian diplomat and the first African President of the United Nations General Assembly
 Carlos Slim Helú (born 1940), Mexican businessman and one of the richest people in the world
 Carlos Slim Domit (born 1967), Mexican businessman and son of the above
 John Slim (wrestler) (1885–1966), British wrestler who competed at the 1908 Olympics
 William Slim, 1st Viscount Slim (1891–1970), British field marshal and thirteenth Governor-General of Australia

See also
 Slim (nickname)
 Salim, an alternative spelling of the same Arabic name

Arabic-language surnames
English-language surnames